"The Ugly Duckling" is a story by Hans Christian Andersen.

Ugly Duckling or The Ugly Duckling may also refer to:

Film and television
The Ugly Duckling (1920 film), a British silent film
The Ugly Duckling (1931 film), a Disney animated adaptation of the Andersen story in black and white
The Ugly Duckling (1939 film), a Disney animated adaptation of the Andersen story in colour
The Ugly Duckling (1959 film), a British comedy film
The Ugly Duckling (1997 film), a British animated film
The Ugly Duckling (2012 film), a South Korean film featuring Oh Dal-su
Ugly Duckling (TV series), a 2015 Thai television series
Patito Feo (Spanish: "Ugly Duckling"), an Argentinian children's TV series
"Ugly Duckling", a season 1 episode of the TV series MacGyver
Stanley, the Ugly Duckling, an ABC 1982 TV project

Music
"The Ugly Duckling", a song from the 1952 musical film Hans Christian Andersen
The Ugly Ducklings, a 1960s Canadian band
Ugly Duckling (hip hop group), an American group
"Ugly Duckling", a song by American rapper Tech N9ne off his Klusterfuk EP

Other uses
The Ugly Duckling (audiobook), a 1987 audiobook narrated by Cher
The Ugly Duckling (Pinkney book), a 1999 adaption of the Andersen story by Jerry Pinkney
Citroën 2CV, a car built for simplicity, nicknamed "The Ugly Duckling"
The Ugly Duckling (play), a comedy by A. A. Milne
 The Ugly Duckling, a 1890 American play by Paul M. Potter
Ugly Duckling (EWTC show), a play produced by the East West Theatre Company in 2009
Ugly duckling theorem, a theorem about classification
Ugly Duckling Rent-A-Car, a rental car company in the United States, now DriveTime Automotive Group Inc.
Ugly Duckling Presse, an American publisher